The 2019–20 Colorado Buffaloes women's basketball team represents the University of Colorado Boulder during the 2019–20 NCAA Division I women's basketball season. The Buffaloes, led by fourth year head coach JR Payne, play their home games at the CU Events Center and are a member of the Pac-12 Conference.

Roster

Schedule

|-
!colspan=9 style=| Exhibition

|-
!colspan=9 style=| Non-conference regular season

|-
!colspan=9 style=| Pac-12 regular season

|-
!colspan=9 style=|  Pac-12 Women's Tournament

Rankings
2019–20 NCAA Division I women's basketball rankings

See also
2019–20 Colorado Buffaloes men's basketball team

References

Colorado Buffaloes women's basketball seasons
Colorado
Colorado Buffaloes
Colorado Buffaloes